Arjuni railway station (station code: AJU) serves Arjuni Morgaon city and surrounding towns and villages in Arjuni Morgaon subdivision of Gondia District, Bhandara district and Gadchiroli district in Maharashtra, India.

References

Gondia district
Railway stations in Gondia district
Nagpur SEC railway division